Mountainside is a borough in Union County, in the U.S. state of New Jersey. The borough is located on a ridge in northern-central New Jersey, within the Raritan Valley and Rahway Valley regions in the New York metropolitan area. As of the 2020 United States census, the borough's population was 7,020, an increase of 335 (+5.0%) from the 2010 census count of 6,685, which in turn reflected an increase of 83 (+1.3%) from the 6,602 counted in the 2000 census.

Mountainside was incorporated as a borough on September 25, 1895, from portions of Westfield Township, based on the results of a referendum held the previous day.

New Jersey Monthly magazine ranked Mountainside as its 16th best place to live in its 2008 rankings of the "Best Places To Live" in New Jersey, as well as eighth in the 2010 list.

History
In 1958, part of Nike missile battery (NY-73) was installed, with the missile launchers themselves in Mountainside while the radar station was installed in Berkeley Heights. It remained in operation until 1963. Remnants of the control site are located adjacent to Governor Livingston High School, while the part of Watchung Reservation that was cleared in order to accommodate the missile launchers became the Watchung Stables.

Geography
According to the United States Census Bureau, the borough had a total area of 4.04 square miles (10.47 km2), including 4.00 square miles (10.35 km2) of land and 0.05 square miles (0.12 km2) of water (1.11%).

Mountainside is bordered by the Union County municipalities of Summit to the north, by Springfield Township to the east, by Westfield to the south and by Berkeley Heights and Scotch Plains to the west.

Demographics

2010 census

The Census Bureau's 2006–2010 American Community Survey showed that (in 2010 inflation-adjusted dollars) median household income was $116,210 (with a margin of error of +/− $22,182) and the median family income was $135,086 (+/− $14,679). Males had a median income of $95,030 (+/− $9,312) versus $58,818 (+/− $8,974) for females. The per capita income for the borough was $52,844 (+/− $5,530). About 1.5% of families and 3.5% of the population were below the poverty line, including 3.1% of those under age 18 and 8.1% of those age 65 or over.

2000 census

As of the 2000 United States census there were 6,602 people, 2,434 households, and 1,925 families residing in the borough. The population density was 1,640.8 people per square mile (634.1/km2). There were 2,478 housing units at an average density of 615.8 per square mile (238.0/km2). The racial makeup of the borough was 95.09% White, 0.94% African American, 0.09% Native American, 2.80% Asian, 0.06% Pacific Islander, 0.27% from other races, and 0.74% from two or more races. Hispanic or Latino of any race were 3.01% of the population.

There were 2,434 households, out of which 29.3% had children under the age of 18 living with them, 71.9% were married couples living together, 5.3% had a female householder with no husband present, and 20.9% were non-families. 17.9% of all households were made up of individuals, and 11.9% had someone living alone who was 65 years of age or older. The average household size was 2.60 and the average family size was 2.95.

In the borough the population was spread out, with 21.1% under the age of 18, 3.8% from 18 to 24, 22.9% from 25 to 44, 27.3% from 45 to 64, and 24.9% who were 65 years of age or older. The median age was 46 years. For every 100 females, there were 89.2 males. For every 100 females age 18 and over, there were 87.1 males.

The median income for a household in the borough was $97,195, and the median income for a family was $105,773. Males had a median income of $78,595 versus $52,667 for females. The per capita income for the borough was $47,474. About 2.0% of families and 3.0% of the population were below the poverty line, including 1.9% of those under age 18 and 2.9% of those age 65 or over.

Government

Local government
Mountainside is governed by a Mayor-Council form of government as authorized through the Option Municipal Charter Law (commonly called the Faulkner Act). The township is one of 71 municipalities (of the 564) statewide that use this form of government. The governing body is comprised of the Mayor and the six-member Borough Council. Under this form of local government, the Mayor is elected for a term of four years and there is a Borough Council comprised of six members, each elected for three-year terms, with two seats coming up for election each year in a three-year cycle. Both the Mayor and Borough Council are elected at-large, that is, to represent the entire community. Elections for all officials in Mountainside are conducted on a partisan basis during the November General Election.

, the mayor of Mountainside is Republican Paul N. Mirabelli, whose term of office ends on December 31, 2023. Members of the Borough Council are Deanna Andre (R, 2023), René Dierkes (R, 2022), Steven Matejek (R, 2023), Robert W. Messler (R, 2024), Donna Pacifico (R, 2022) and Rachel Pater (R, 2024).

Federal, state and county representation
Mountainside is located in the 7th Congressional District and is part of New Jersey's 21st state legislative district.

 

Union County is governed by a Board of County Commissioners, whose nine members are elected at-large to three-year terms of office on a staggered basis with three seats coming up for election each year, with an appointed County Manager overseeing the day-to-day operations of the county. At an annual reorganization meeting held in the beginning of January, the board selects a Chair and Vice Chair from among its members. , Union County's County Commissioners are 
Chair Rebecca Williams (D, Plainfield, term as commissioner and as chair ends December 31, 2022), 
Vice Chair Christopher Hudak (D, Linden, term as commissioner ends 2023; term as vice chair ends 2022),
James E. Baker Jr. (D, Rahway, 2024),
Angela R. Garretson (D, Hillside, 2023),
Sergio Granados (D, Elizabeth, 2022),
Bette Jane Kowalski (D, Cranford, 2022), 
Lourdes M. Leon (D, Elizabeth, 2023),
Alexander Mirabella (D, Fanwood, 2024) and 
Kimberly Palmieri-Mouded (D, Westfield, 2024).
Constitutional officers elected on a countywide basis are
County Clerk Joanne Rajoppi (D, Union Township, 2025),
Sheriff Peter Corvelli (D, Kenilworth, 2023) and
Surrogate Susan Dinardo (acting).
The County Manager is Edward Oatman.

Politics
As of March 2011, there were a total of 4,744 registered voters in Mountainside, of which 1,201 (25.3% vs. 41.8% countywide) were registered as Democrats, 1,568 (33.1% vs. 15.3%) were registered as Republicans and 1,974 (41.6% vs. 42.9%) were registered as Unaffiliated. There was one voter registered to another party. Among the borough's 2010 Census population, 71.0% (vs. 53.3% in Union County) were registered to vote, including 92.5% of those ages 18 and over (vs. 70.6% countywide).

In the 2012 presidential election, Republican Mitt Romney received 2,100 votes (59.2% vs. 32.3% countywide), ahead of Democrat Barack Obama with 1,401 votes (39.5% vs. 66.0%) and other candidates with 30 votes (0.8% vs. 0.8%), among the 3,548 ballots cast by the borough's 4,940 registered voters, for a turnout of 71.8% (vs. 68.8% in Union County). In the 2008 presidential election, Republican John McCain received 2,331 votes (60.0% vs. 35.2% countywide), ahead of Democrat Barack Obama with 1,500 votes (38.6% vs. 63.1%) and other candidates with 33 votes (0.8% vs. 0.9%), among the 3,888 ballots cast by the borough's 4,911 registered voters, for a turnout of 79.2% (vs. 74.7% in Union County). In the 2004 presidential election, Republican George W. Bush received 2,215 votes (58.0% vs. 40.3% countywide), ahead of Democrat John Kerry with 1,561 votes (40.8% vs. 58.3%) and other candidates with 31 votes (0.8% vs. 0.7%), among the 3,822 ballots cast by the borough's 4,796 registered voters, for a turnout of 79.7% (vs. 72.3% in the whole county).

In the 2013 gubernatorial election, Republican Chris Christie received 69.9% of the vote (1,595 cast), ahead of Democrat Barbara Buono with 29.0% (661 votes), and other candidates with 1.1% (26 votes), among the 2,320 ballots cast by the borough's 4,860 registered voters (38 ballots were spoiled), for a turnout of 47.7%. In the 2009 gubernatorial election, Republican Chris Christie received 1,754 votes (61.8% vs. 41.7% countywide), ahead of Democrat Jon Corzine with 842 votes (29.6% vs. 50.6%), Independent Chris Daggett with 204 votes (7.2% vs. 5.9%) and other candidates with 17 votes (0.6% vs. 0.8%), among the 2,840 ballots cast by the borough's 4,827 registered voters, yielding a 58.8% turnout (vs. 46.5% in the county).

Education
The Mountainside School District serves public school students in pre-kindergarten through eighth grade. As of the 2020–21 school year, the district, comprised of two schools, had an enrollment of 725 students and 71.3 classroom teachers (on an FTE basis), for a student–teacher ratio of 10.2:1. Schools in the district (with 2020–21 enrollment data from the National Center for Education Statistics) are 
Beechwood School with 256 students in grades Pre-K–2 and 
Deerfield School with 461 students in grades 3–8.

Public school students in ninth through twelfth grades attend Governor Livingston High School in Berkeley Heights, as part of a sending/receiving relationship with the Berkeley Heights Public Schools that is covered by an agreement that runs through the end of 2021–2022 school year. As of the 2020–21 school year, the high school had an enrollment of 960 students and 87.9 classroom teachers (on an FTE basis), for a student–teacher ratio of 10.9:1.

Students also have the choice to attend the programs of the Union County Vocational Technical Schools, which serve students from across Union County.

Emergency medical services
Emergency Medical Services for the borough of Mountainside is provided by the Mountainside Rescue Squad during nights and weekends. Since 2006, weekday daytime coverage has been provided by Atlantic Ambulance EMS, which has a paramedic unit stationed in Mountainside.

Transportation

Roads and highways

U.S. Route 22 and Interstate 78 are the main highways running through Mountainside.

Public transportation
NJ Transit Bus Operations routes 114 and 117 provide service to the Port Authority Bus Terminal  in Midtown Manhattan in New York City  while routes 65 and 66 travel to Downtown Newark, all making local stops at points in proximate communities. An early use of bus rapid transit in New Jersey, a BBS (bus bypass shoulder, originally called a BOS or bus on shoulder lane) has been in operation for many years. Unlike most municipalities along Route 22, zoning in Mountainside does not allow for much commercial development adjacent to the freeway. For a one-mile stretch in the town, the eastbound shoulder on the arterial road can be used for peak hour buses. In 2012, the New Jersey Department of Transportation (NJDOT) regulated the BBS as an exclusive bus lane from 6 to 7:30am. In 2009, NJDOT funded construction of two bus turnouts along the road in nearby Union.

NJ Transit rail service is accessible via Summit station, and it has frequent direct service to New York Penn Station.

Notable people

People who were born in, residents of, or otherwise closely associated with Mountainside include:

 Erika Amato (born 1969), singer and actress who was a founding member of the band Velvet Chain
 John W. Campbell (1910–1971), science fiction writer who was editor of Astounding Science Fiction from 1937 until his death
 Bob Clotworthy (born 1931), diver who won the bronze medal at his Olympic debut in 1952 in Helsinki, Finland in the men's springboard event, followed by the gold medal, four years later in Melbourne, Australia in the same event
 Laurie Collyer (born 1967), film director, best known for Sherrybaby
 Angelo DeCarlo (1902–1973), member of the New York Genovese crime family
 Harry Devlin (born 1918), cartoonist for magazines such as Collier's Weekly
 Ina Golub (1938–2015), fiber artist who specialized in Judaica
 Charles J. Irwin (1930–2005), politician who served in the New Jersey General Assembly from the 9th at-large district from 1968 to 1971
 Bitty Schram (born 1968), actress who appeared on Monk and in the 1992 film A League of Their Own
 Dale Torborg (born 1971), conditioning coordinator for the Chicago White Sox and former professional wrestler best known for his time in World Championship Wrestling
 Jeff Torborg (born 1941), former Major League Baseball player and manager
 Hela Yungst (1950–2002), television entertainer and beauty pageant winner

Gallery

References

External links

 Mountainside Borough website

 
1895 establishments in New Jersey
Boroughs in Union County, New Jersey
Faulkner Act (mayor–council)
Populated places established in 1895